The Corner Brook Civic Centre (previously named the Canada Games Centre and the Pepsi Centre) is a 3,100-seat multi-purpose arena in Corner Brook, Newfoundland and Labrador, Canada. It was home to the ice hockey, figure skating, judo, and squash events of the 1999 Canada Winter Games. Previously run by Memorial University through Western Sports and Entertainment, it is currently owned and operated by the City of Corner Brook.  The Civic Centre is the home arena of the Corner Brook Royals. The facility also includes a second, smaller, arena to host small scale ice events, as well as the "Pepsi Studio" capable of hosting large-scale conferences and sporting events.

On September 11, 2005, the Civic Centre played host to an exhibition game of the then newly formed St. John's Fog Devils of the QMJHL versus the Ottawa 67's of the OHL. The arena played host to an AHL exhibition game between the St. John's IceCaps and the Syracuse Crunch on October 4, 2012, in Game 1 of the Mary Brown's Cup three-game series, coinciding with the IceCaps' training camp for the 2012-13 AHL season.

References

External links
Corner Brook Civic Centre, Corner Brook NL

Ice hockey venues in Newfoundland and Labrador
Sports venues in Newfoundland and Labrador
Indoor ice hockey venues in Canada
Indoor arenas in Newfoundland and Labrador
Canada Games venues
Corner Brook